The Yakovlev EG (Eksperimentalnyi Gelikopter), also commonly known as the Yak-M11FR-1 and Sh (Shootka), was an experimental aircraft with coaxial rotors. The prototype was first flown by V.V. Tezavrovsky in December 1947.

Design and development
The fuselage of the EG was a welded steel tube truss with duralumin skinning on the fwd fuselage back to the rear of the engine compartment. The rear fuselage was fabric covered and supported a tailplane-style unit with twin endplate fins, as well as a tailskid. The Pilot and Passenger sat side by side under a glazed canopy with a car-style door on each side.

The M-11FR engine was mounted behind the gearbox which it drove via a short shaft. The gearbox supported the Rotor pylon
which had two, contra-rotating, co-axial, two-bladed rotors. A fixed tricycle undercarriage mounted on steel tube trusses supported the helicopter on the ground.

Flight testing revealed vibration at forward speeds above  In an effort to reduce vibration the tailplane and fins were removed.

In early 1948 the M-11FR engine was replaced by a  M-12, which proved troublesome so an M-11FR was refitted to complete the flight trials by 8 July 1948.

Specifications

See also

References

Further reading
 

1940s Soviet experimental aircraft
1940s Soviet helicopters
EG
Coaxial rotor helicopters
Aircraft first flown in 1947
Single-engined piston helicopters